Bake Robert Tumuhaise is a Ugandan author and motivational speaker. He is the author of an inspirational novel, Tears of My Mother, and a motivational book, Tapping God’s Blessings:Keys to Open Doors of Success in Your Life. He is the Managing Director of World Of Inspiration; Founder of the Authors’ Forum in Uganda. He is the author of five published inspirational books, he is an inspirational Columnist with Saturday Vision (Uganda) and Sunday Times (Rwanda) and a Director on the Board of Amakula International Film Festival. He is a graduate Teacher from Makerere University.

Early life and education
Bake was born in 1981 in Kisoro district, Rubuguri, near the Uganda-Congo border, to Aloysius Bakesigaki and Mishemburo. He is the last born in a family of eight. He went to Rubuguru primary school, St. Paul's seminary Kabale, Iryaruvumba High School, Kigezi High School and Makerere University.

Published works

References 

Living people
Ugandan novelists
Male novelists
Ugandan male writers
Makerere University alumni
Year of birth missing (living people)
People from Kisoro District